Demolition War is the first EP released by the anarcho-punk group Subhumans. It was originally released on Spiderleg Records in 1981, and was also released as part of the EP-LP compilation on Bluurg Records in 1985.

Track listing
 "Parasites" - 2:37
 "Drugs of Youth" - 2:00
 "Animal" - 2:46
 "Society" - 1:43
 "Who's Gonna Fight in the Third World War?" - 2:10
 "Human Error" - 3:46

Personnel
Dick Lucas - vocals
Bruce - guitar
Grant - bass
Trotsky - drums
Steve C. - producer

1981 EPs
Subhumans (British band) albums